The 2012–13 Ukrainian Basketball SuperLeague was the 22nd edition of the Ukrainian top-tier basketball championship. The season has started on 28 September 2012 and ended on 31 May 2013. BC Budivelnyk won the Ukrainian championship by beating BC Azovmash 4–3 in the Finals. Ferro-ZNTU ended on the third place.

Participants

Regular season

Playoffs

Bracket

Quarterfinals 
Budivelnyk - Hoverla 4–1 (85:82, 96:59, 95:102, 78:77, 101:97 OT)
Khimik - Politekhnika-Halychyna 0–4 (81:87, 75:82, 73:77, 56:76)
Ferro-ZNTU - Cherkaski Mavpy 4–1 (88:83, 93:89 OT, 83:76, 85:87, 94:83)
Azovmash - Donetsk 4–1 (102:93, 82:74, 97:96 OT, 49:83, 97:96 OT)

Semifinals 
Budivelnyk - Politekhnika-Halychyna 4–0 (73:56, 77:67, 80:65, 69:56)
Ferro-ZNTU - Azovmash 0–4 (63:82, 73:79, 79:86, 89:93)

Third place 
Ferro-ZNTU - Politekhnika-Halychyna 4–0 (97:79, 102:89, 94:73, 87:67)

Final 
Budivelnyk - Azovmash 4–3 (89:82, 73:77, 74:86, 80:63, 89:75, 95:96, 82:70)

Awards

MVP
 Malcolm Delaney – Budivelnyk

All-Superleague team

Statistical leaders

Points

Rebounds

Assists

Ukrainian clubs in European competitions

Ukrainian clubs in Regional competitions

References 

Ukrainian Basketball SuperLeague seasons
1
Ukraine